"Games People Play" is a song written, composed, and performed by American singer-songwriter Joe South, released in August 1968, that won the Grammy Award for Best Contemporary Song and the Grammy Award for Song of the Year, both for 1970.

Release
"Games People Play" is a protest song whose lyrics speak against various forms of hatred, hypocrisy, inhumanity, intolerance, and irresponsibility, in both interpersonal and social interactions between people.  Billboard favorably reviewed the song some three months after its release and eight weeks before it finally reached the Hot 100.

The song was released on South's debut album Introspect and as a single, reaching No. 12 on the Hot 100.  It was also a No. 6 hit in the UK in 1969, No. 4 in Ireland, and won the Grammy Award for Best Contemporary Song and the Grammy Award for Song of the Year.

The distinctive guitar in the opening is played on a Danelectro electric sitar, which can be seen in a video recorded to support South's album Introspect. Concurrent with South's version of the song on the pop chart, Freddy Weller, guitarist for Paul Revere and the Raiders, released a country version of the song in 1969 as his debut single; this rendition spent two weeks at No. 2 on the country chart.

Charts

Weekly charts

Year-end charts

Inner Circle version

"Games People Play" was covered by Jamaican reggae band Inner Circle on their 1994 album, Reggae Dancer. In the US, it peaked at number 84 on the Billboard Hot 100 and number 51 on the Cash Box Top 100. In Europe, it was successful, reaching the top 10 in several countries, like the Netherlands, Sweden and Switzerland. The single reached its best chart position in Finland, where it peaked at number two. Outside Europe, it also hit number four in New Zealand.

Critical reception
Larry Flick from Billboard wrote: Alan Jones from Music Week deemed it "another reggae cover of little significance but great potential", adding that this version "is bright, bouncy and competent. It's already a huge hit in Europe, and an MTV staple, so UK success seems simply a matter of time." Mark Sutherland from Smash Hits gave the song four out of five, saying, "If everything in Life was as reliable as Inner Circle. Every summer they seem to come up with the perfect smiley reggae record." He described it as "a bounce-along beach party of a choon with a, erm, "NA NA NA" chorus. Unbeatable as a soundtrack for beach volleyball – and as big a hit as their lard-tub guitarist."

Music video
A music video was produced to promote the single, directed by Mathias Julien. It features the band performing on the beach. Other times they perform in a boat. Julien also directed the video for the band's 1992 hit, "Sweat (A La La La La Long)".

Track listing
 CD maxi, Europe (1994)
"Games People Play" (Radio Edit) – 3:26
"Games People Play" (Miami Mix) – 3:55
"Games People Play" (Big Game Dub) – 5:07
"Games People Play" (Extended Version) – 5:40

Charts

Weekly charts

Year-end charts

Other cover versions
"Games People Play" has been covered by, at least, 39 artists in total, including by:
the Staple Singers
Mel Torme
Hank Williams Jr.
Tesla
Murray Head
Bill Haley & His Comets
Johnnie Taylor
the Georgia Satellites
Lee Dorsey
Jerry Lee Lewis
Petula Clark
Dionne Warwick
Dick Gaughan
Lissie
Waylon Jennings
Jeannie C. Riley
Nathan Abshire
Conway Twitty

Popular culture
The song was referenced in the lyrics to the Beach Boys' song "Games Two Can Play".

References

External links
New Cajun Version/Genealogy of Versions

1968 singles
1969 singles
1994 singles
Songs written by Joe South
Joe South songs
Grammy Award for Song of the Year
Protest songs
1968 songs
Capitol Records singles
Warner Music Group singles
Inner Circle (band) songs
Freddy Weller songs
Music videos directed by Mathias Julien
Number-one singles in South Africa